In estimation theory and statistics, the Cramér–Rao bound (CRB) expresses a lower bound on the variance of unbiased estimators of a deterministic (fixed, though unknown) parameter, the variance of any such estimator is at least as high as the inverse of the Fisher information. Equivalently, it expresses an upper bound on the precision (the inverse of variance) of unbiased estimators: the precision of any such estimator is at most the Fisher information.
The result is named in honor of Harald Cramér and C. R. Rao, but has independently also been derived by Maurice Fréchet, Georges Darmois, as well as Alexander Aitken and Harold Silverstone.

An unbiased estimator that achieves this lower bound is said to be (fully) efficient. Such a solution achieves the lowest possible mean squared error among all unbiased methods, and is therefore the minimum variance unbiased (MVU) estimator. However, in some cases, no unbiased technique exists which achieves the bound. This may occur either if for any unbiased estimator, there exists another with a strictly smaller variance, or if an MVU estimator exists, but its variance is strictly greater than the inverse of the Fisher information.

The Cramér–Rao bound can also be used to bound the variance of  estimators of given bias. In some cases, a biased approach can result in both a variance and a mean squared error that are  the unbiased Cramér–Rao lower bound; see estimator bias.

Statement 

The Cramér–Rao bound is stated in this section for several increasingly general cases, beginning with the case in which the parameter is a scalar and its estimator is unbiased. All versions of the bound require certain regularity conditions, which hold for most well-behaved distributions. These conditions are listed later in this section.

Scalar unbiased case 

where the Fisher information  is defined by

If  is twice differentiable and certain regularity conditions hold, then the Fisher information can also be defined as follows: 

The efficiency of an unbiased estimator  measures how close this estimator's variance comes to this lower bound; estimator efficiency is defined as

or the minimum possible variance for an unbiased estimator divided by its actual variance.
The Cramér–Rao lower bound thus gives
.

General scalar case 
A more general form of the bound can be obtained by considering a biased estimator , whose expectation is not  but a function of this parameter, say, . Hence    is not generally equal to 0. In this case, the bound is given by

Bound on the variance of biased estimators 
Apart from being a bound on estimators of functions of the parameter, this approach can be used to derive a bound on the variance of biased estimators with a given bias, as follows. Consider an estimator  with bias , and let . Thus, any estimator  whose bias is given by a function  satisfies

It's trivial to have a small variance − an "estimator" that is constant has a variance of zero. But from the above equation we find that the mean squared error of a biased estimator is bounded by

using the standard decomposition of the MSE. Note, however, that if  this bound might be less than the unbiased Cramér–Rao bound . For instance, in the example of estimating variance below, .

Multivariate case 
Extending the Cramér–Rao bound to multiple parameters, define a parameter column vector

with probability density function  which satisfies the two regularity conditions below.

The Fisher information matrix is a  matrix with element  defined as
 

The Cramér–Rao bound then states that the covariance matrix of  satisfies
,

where
 The matrix inequality  is understood to mean that the matrix  is positive semidefinite, and

 

If it is inconvenient to compute the inverse of the Fisher information matrix,
then one can simply take the reciprocal of the corresponding diagonal element
to find a (possibly loose) lower bound.

Regularity conditions 
The bound relies on two weak regularity conditions on the probability density function, and the estimator :
 The Fisher information is always defined; equivalently, for all  such that ,  exists, and is finite.
This condition can often be confirmed by using the fact that integration and differentiation can be swapped when either of the following cases hold:
 The function  has infinite support, is continuously differentiable, and the integral converges uniformly for all .

Proof

Proof for the general case based on the Chapman–Robbins bound 
Proof based on.

A standalone proof for the general scalar case 
Assume that  is an estimator with expectation  (based on the observations ), i.e. that .  The goal is to prove that, for all ,

Let  be a random variable with probability density function .
Define  as the score:

where the chain rule is used in the final equality above. This is because:

 

where the integral and partial derivative have been interchanged (justified by the second regularity condition).

Expanding this expression we have

again because the integration and differentiation operations commute (second condition).

The Cauchy–Schwarz inequality shows that

therefore

which proves the proposition.

Examples

Multivariate normal distribution 
For the case of a d-variate normal distribution
 
the Fisher information matrix has elements

where "tr" is the trace.

For example, let  be a sample of  independent observations with unknown mean  and known variance  .

Then the Fisher information is a scalar given by

and so the Cramér–Rao bound is

Normal variance with known mean 
Suppose X is a normally distributed random variable with known mean  and unknown variance .  Consider the following statistic:

What is the variance of T?

(the second equality follows directly from the definition of variance).
Thus

Now, what is the Fisher information in the sample? Recall that the score  is defined as

where  is the likelihood function.  Thus in this case,

where the second equality is from elementary calculus.

Thus the information in a sample of  independent observations is just  times this, or 

The Cramér–Rao bound states that

In this case, the inequality is saturated (equality is achieved), showing that the estimator is efficient.

However, we can achieve a lower mean squared error using a biased estimator. The estimator

obviously has a smaller variance, which is in fact

Its bias is

so its mean squared error is

which is clearly less than what unbiased estimators can achieve according to the Cramér–Rao bound.

See also 
 Chapman–Robbins bound
 Kullback's inequality
 Brascamp–Lieb inequality

References and notes

Further reading 
 
 
 . Chapter 3.
 . Section 3.1.3.

External links 
FandPLimitTool a GUI-based software to calculate the Fisher information and Cramér-Rao lower bound with application to single-molecule microscopy.

Articles containing proofs
Statistical inequalities
Estimation theory